Haram is a former municipality in Møre og Romsdal county, Norway. It was part of the Sunnmøre region. The administrative center was Brattvåg, the industrial center of Sunnmøre. Other important villages in the municipality included Austnes, Eidsvik, Helle, Longva, Hildrestranda, Søvik, Tennfjord, and Vatne.

Brattvåg IL is a sports club based in the municipality. Tennfjord Mannskor is a male choir from the village of Tennfjord. The Ulla Lighthouse and Hellevik Lighthouse are both located in the northwestern part of the municipality.

At the time if its dissolution in 2020, the  municipality is the 294th largest by area out of the 422 municipalities in Norway. Haram is the 122nd most populous municipality in Norway with a population of 9,345.

General information

The parish of Haram was established as a municipality on 1 January 1838 (see formannskapsdistrikt law). The western island district of Roald was separated from Haram on 1 January 1890 to form the new municipality of Roald. This left 1,956 people left in Haram.

During the 1960s, there were many municipal mergers across Norway due to the work of the Schei Committee. On 1 January 1965, three municipal changes involving Haram occurred:
The part of Haram Municipality on the island of Harøya, including the Myklebost area and the smaller surrounding islands to the west of there (population: 287), was separated from Haram Municipality and merged into the neighboring Sandøy Municipality to the northeast.
Most of Vatne Municipality (population: 2,260) to the southeast of Haram Municipality was merged into Haram Municipality. 
The Søvik area in Borgund Municipality (population: 1,191) to the south of Haram Municipality were merged into Haram. 
These three boundary changes created a much larger municipality of Haram.

On 1 January 2020, the neighboring municipalities of Haram, Skodje, Ørskog, Sandøy, and Ålesund were merged to form a new, large municipality of Ålesund. This occurred because in June 2017, the Parliament of Norway voted to approve the merger.

Name
The municipality (originally the parish) is named after the old Haram farm, since the first Haram Church was built there. The meaning of the first element is unknown and the last element is hamarr which means "rocky hill". Before 1889, the name was written Harham.

Coat of arms
The coat of arms was granted on 7 August 1987. The arms show three waves in blue with a silver or white background, symbolizing the importance of the sea in this island municipality.

Dialect
The dialect of the district was well known for its practice of H-dropping and the old and traditional pronunciation of the name of the municipality was [a:ram].

Churches
The Church of Norway has five parishes within the municipality of Haram. It is part of the Nordre Sunnmøre prosti (deanery) in the Diocese of Møre.

Geography
The municipality of Haram includes many islands including Bjørnøya, Fjørtofta, Haramsøya, Løvsøya, Skuløya, and Terøya. The islands of Bjørnøya and Terøya are connected to the mainland via causeways. The islands of Haramsøya and Skuløya are connected with the Ullasund Bridge. The rest of the islands have ferry connections to the mainland. The new Nordøyvegen bridge and tunnel network will connect all of the main islands of Haram to the mainland when it is completed in 2022. The Haramsfjorden, Vatnefjorden, and Romsdal Fjord all flow through the municipality.

The municipality shares land borders with Vestnes Municipality to the east and Skodje Municipality to the south. The rest of the municipality is surrounded by sea. The municipality also borders (by sea) Sandøy Municipality and Midsund Municipality to the northeast, Ålesund Municipality to the south, and Giske Municipality to the west.

Government
All municipalities in Norway, including Haram, are responsible for primary education (through 10th grade), outpatient health services, senior citizen services, unemployment and other social services, zoning, economic development, and municipal roads. The municipality is governed by a municipal council of elected representatives, which in turn elect a mayor.  The municipality falls under the Sunnmøre District Court and the Frostating Court of Appeal.

Municipal council
The municipal council of Haram is made up of 27 representatives that are elected to four year terms. The party breakdown of the final municipal council was as follows:

Media gallery

See also
List of former municipalities of Norway

References

External links
Municipal fact sheet from Statistics Norway 

 
Ålesund
Former municipalities of Norway
1838 establishments in Norway
2020 disestablishments in Norway
Populated places disestablished in 2020